The Open Source Software Institute (OSSI) is a U.S.-based 501(c)(6), non-profit organization whose mission is to promote the development and implementation of open-source software solutions within US Federal, state and municipal government agencies. OSSI was established in 2000 and has focused on strategic initiatives to promote the adoption of open source within US Department of Defense and Department of Homeland Security.

Projects
Efforts include securing the Federal Information Processing Standards (FIPS) 140-2 validation for the OpenSSL cryptographic module library, participation in development of the U.S. Navy's Open Source Guidance Document, securing the Open Source Corporate Management Information System (OSCMIS) with the Defense Information Systems Agency, and working with the Department of Homeland Security's Science and Technology Directorate to establish and implement the Homeland Open Security Technology (HOST) program, which promotes open security.

See also
 Open Source Initiative

References

Further reading

External links
Official Website
Open Source Evolution

Free and open-source software organizations
501(c)(6) nonprofit organizations
Organizations established in 2000